"Butterflies" is a song by American country singer–songwriter Kacey Musgraves from her fourth studio album, Golden Hour (2018). It was released on February 23, 2018 alongside "Space Cowboy" as the second single from the album through MCA Nashville Records. Musgraves wrote the song with Luke Laird and Natalie Hemby, and produced it alongside Daniel Tashian and Ian Fitchuk. According to Musgraves, "Butterflies" was co-written with Shane McAnally; however, he was not credited as one its songwriters in the album's liner notes.

Composition
A "genre-defying" song described as country pop, pop, and disco with a "reggae-fied twang", "Butterflies" departs from the lyrical cynicism expressed in Musgraves' previous songs. With lyrics "[representing] those feelings that you have when you're first meeting somebody and you fall in love".

Background
The song was written in early 2016 shortly after Musgraves had met singer–songwriter Ruston Kelly. The pair were married in 2017 before filing for divorce three years later.

Critical reception
Rolling Stone compared the "earnest" lyrics of "Butterflies" to Taylor Swift's work from Fearless (2008). NPR compared its sound to Little Big Town, with its production "stepping easily beyond any genre category".

Live performance
Musgraves first performed "Butterflies" on January 21, 2017 on the radio show A Prairie Home Companion. In 2018, Musgraves performed the song on Today in March, Austin City Limits in November, and at the 13th Billboard Women in Music event in December. In April 2018, Musgraves recorded an acoustic performance of the song in London to serve as one of the original videos for the Hot Country playlist on Spotify.

Music video
The music video for "Butterflies", like the clip for "Space Cowboy", was directed by Courtney Phillips and shot in Mexico City. It was released on May 4, 2018 and shows Musgraves walking around a city at night.

Accolades
"Butterflies" won the Grammy Award for Best Country Solo Performance at the 61st annual awards ceremony in 2019.

Chart performance
On Billboard weekly charts, the song peaked at number 32 on the Hot Country Songs chart and number 56 on the Country Airplay chart, spending two weeks on the latter.

Cover versions
Rock band Hawthorne Heights covered "Butterflies" for their two-track project Dads of Sad (2019); Musgraves reacted positively to the emo cover. The song was performed by contestant Cali Wilson on the 17th season of the American music competition series The Voice.

Credits and personnel
Credits adapted from the liner notes of Golden Hour.
 Luke Laird – songwriting
 Natalie Hemby – songwriting
 Kacey Musgraves – songwriting, production, acoustic guitar
 Ian Fitchuk – production, drums, Juno 60, piano
 Daniel Tashian – production, bass guitar, baritone guitar
 Todd Lombardo – electric guitar, acoustic guitar, banjo
 Russ Pahl – pedal steel guitar
 Serban Ghenea – mixing
 John Hanes – engineering for mixing
 Craig Alvin – recording
 Greg Calbi – mastering
 Steve Fallone – mastering

Charts

References

2016 songs
2018 singles
Kacey Musgraves songs
MCA Nashville Records singles
Songs written by Kacey Musgraves
Songs written by Natalie Hemby
Songs written by Luke Laird
Song recordings produced by Daniel Tashian
Song recordings produced by Ian Fitchuk